Marusya Ivanova Luybcheva (born 20 July 1949, in Mitrovtsi, Montana district) is a Bulgarian politician who served as a Member of the European Parliament from 2007 until 2009 and from 2013 until 2014. She is a member of the Coalition for Bulgaria, part of the Party of European Socialists.

Political career
Luybcheva became a member of the European Parliament on 1 January 2007 with the accession of Bulgaria to the European Union. During her time in parliament, she served on the Committee on International Trade (2007–2009), the Committee on Budgetary Control (2007–2009) and the Committee on Foreign Affairs (2013–2014). She was a substitute for the Committee on Budgets and for the Committee on Women's Rights and Gender Equality. 

In addition to her committee assignments, Lyubcheva was a member of the parliament's delegations to the EU-Kazakhstan, EU-Kyrgyzstan and EU-Uzbekistan Parliamentary Cooperation Committees, and for relations with Tajikistan, Turkmenistan and Mongolia. She was also a substitute member of the delegation to the EU-Ukraine Parliamentary Cooperation Committee.

References

External links
 

1949 births
Living people
Coalition for Bulgaria MEPs
MEPs for Bulgaria 2007
Women MEPs for Bulgaria
MEPs for Bulgaria 2007–2009
21st-century Bulgarian women politicians
21st-century Bulgarian politicians